Franz Rogowski (born 2 February 1986) is a German actor and dancer. He has appeared in films directed by Michael Haneke, Christian Petzold and Terrence Malick.

Life and career
Franz Rogowski was born in 1986 in Freiburg im Breisgau, West Germany. The actor is known for the internationally successful film Victoria (2015). The German thriller is one of the few feature films shot in a single continuous take and won amongst other things the Silver Bear for Outstanding Artistic Contribution for Cinematography as well as the German Film Award in six categories. From 2015 until 2019 Rogowski was a member of the Munich Kammerspiele. In 2017, he appeared in the French film Happy End directed by Michael Haneke.

Rogowski became internationally known for his performance in Transit. The German film earned him a nomination for the Florida Film Critics Circle Award. Transit ended up on Barack Obama's list of his favorite films of 2019.

Films with Rogowski were screened in main competition at the Berlin International Film Festival, Cannes Film Festival and Venice Film Festival.

In 2021, he was nominated for the European Film Award for Best Actor in Great Freedom. The following year, Rogowski received a David di Donatello nomination for his performance in the Italian film Freaks Out.

Filmography

Film

Television

Awards
2013: Förderpreis Neues Deutsches Kino (Advancement Award New German Cinema) for Love Steaks
2018: Shooting Stars Award at the Berlin Film Festival
2018: German Film Award: Best Actor in In the Aisles
2021: Austin Fantastic Fest: Best Actor in Luzifer
2021: Sitges Film Festival: Best Actor in Luzifer
2021: Hamptons International Film Festival: Special Jury Prize for Exceptional Performance in Great Freedom
2021: Seville European Film Festival: Best Actor in Great Freedom
2021: Torino Film Festival: Best Actor in Great Freedom
2022: German Screen Actors Award: Best Actor in Great Freedom

References

External links

Official website
Franz Rogowski at Instagram

1986 births
21st-century German male actors
German male film actors
German male stage actors
German male television actors
Living people
Actors from Freiburg im Breisgau